The 1923 Primera División was the 23rd season of top-flight football in Uruguay. This was organised by official body, Uruguayan Football Association (AUF), while dissident body, Uruguayan Football Federation (FUF), organised its own championship simultaneously.

Overview 
The tournament consisted of a round-robin. It involved twelve teams, and the champion was Nacional.

This year was the first fractured Uruguayan football championship, due to the schism that triggered the emergence of a parallel Uruguayan Football Federation organizing their own championship. However, the league recognized by FIFA and CONMEBOL remained the Uruguayan Football Association (AUF), which achieved the same for the fourth time to get South American Championship selections with their representative, qualifying for the Paris Olympic Games the following year.

Disenrollment of AUF clubs Peñarol and Central the previous year, produced the first appearance of clubs Bella Vista and Fénix in the first division. In turn, Montevideo Wanderers, Charley and Lito participated in both tournaments with two different teams. Lito were dubbed "round" in the AUF and Lito "square" in the FUF, differing by the shield they carried on a Barca shirt. The Wanderers used their official name in the AUF, registering with an alternate team under the name of "Athletic Wanderers" in the FUF.

Teams

League standings

See also
 1923 Uruguayan Primera División of FUF

External links 
 Uruguay – List of final tables 1900–2000 on RSSSF

Uruguayan Primera División seasons
Uru
1923 in Uruguayan football